The "New England Reformers" was a lecture by Ralph Waldo Emerson read before "The Society" in Amory Hall, on Sunday, March 3, 1844.  "The Society" has been identified as the American Anti-Slavery Society, led by William Lloyd Garrison.

In this lecture Emerson commented that men "are conservatives after dinner...".

References

External links

Essays by Ralph Waldo Emerson
1844 essays
American Anti-Slavery Society